Pocket, previously known as Read It Later, is a social bookmarking service for storing, sharing, and discovering web bookmarks. Released in 2007, the service was originally only for desktop and laptop computers, and is now available for macOS, Windows, iOS, Android, Windows Phone, BlackBerry, Kobo eReaders, and web browsers.

History
Pocket was introduced in August 2007 as a Mozilla Firefox browser extension named Read It Later by Nathan (Nate) Weiner. Once his product was used by millions of people, he moved his office to Silicon Valley and four other people joined the Read It Later team. Weiner's intention was to have the application be like a TiVo for web content and giving users access to that content on any device.

Read It Later obtained venture capital investments of US$2.5 million in 2011 and $5.0 million in 2012. The 2011 funding came from Foundation Capital, Baseline Ventures, Google Ventures, Founder Collective and unnamed angel investors. The company rejected an acquisition offer by Evernote after showing concerns that Evernote intended to shut down the Read It Later service and amalgamate its functionality into Evernote's main service.

Initially the Read It Later app was available in a free version and a paid version that included additional features. After the rebranding to Pocket, all paid features were made available in a free and advertisement-free app. In May 2014, a paid subscription service called Pocket Premium was introduced, adding server-side storage of articles and more powerful search tools.

In June 2015, Pocket was included in Firefox, via a toolbar button and link to a user's Pocket list in the bookmarks menu. The integration was controversial, as users displayed concerns for the direct integration of a proprietary service into an open source application, and that it could not be completely disabled without editing advanced settings, unlike third-party extensions. A Mozilla spokesperson stated that the feature was meant to leverage the service's popularity among Firefox users and clarified that all code related to the integration was open source. The spokesperson added that "[Mozilla had] gotten lots of positive feedback about the integration from users".

On February 27, 2017, Pocket announced that it had been acquired by Mozilla Corporation, the commercial arm of Firefox's non-profit development group. Mozilla staff stated that Pocket would continue to operate as an independent subsidiary but that it would be leveraged as part of an ongoing "Context Graph" project. There are plans to open-source the server-side code of Pocket,.

Functions
The application allows the user to save an article or web page to remote servers for later reading. The article is then sent to the user's Pocket list (synced to all of their devices) for offline reading. Pocket removes clutter from articles, and allows the user to add tags to their articles and to adjust text settings for easier reading.

Userbase
The application had 17 million users and 1 billion saves, as of September 2015. Some applications, such as Flipboard, Google Currents, and Twitter  use Pocket's API. Pocket was listed among TIMEs 50 Best Android Applications for 2013.

Reception
Kent German of CNET said that "Read It Later is oh so incredibly useful for saving all the articles and news stories I find while commuting or waiting in line." Erez Zukerman of PC World said that supporting the developer is enough reason to buy what he deemed a "handy app". Bill Barol of Forbes said that although Read It Later works less well than Instapaper, "it makes my beloved Instapaper look and feel a little stodgy."

In 2015, Pocket was awarded a Material Design Award for Adaptive Layout by Google for their Android application.

See also
 IFTTT
 Pinboard (website)

References

External links
 

2007 software
2017 mergers and acquisitions
Android (operating system) software
Application software
BlackBerry software
Cross-platform mobile software
Google Chrome extensions
IOS software
Mozilla acquisitions
Online bookmarking services
Firefox
Firefox extensions merged to Firefox